The International Association for the Study of Pain (IASP) is an international learned society promoting research, education, and policies for the understanding, prevention, and treatment of pain. IASP was founded in 1973 under the leadership of John J. Bonica. Its secretariat, formerly based in Seattle, Washington, is now located in Washington, D.C. It publishes the scientific journal PAIN, PAIN Reports and PAIN: Clinical Updates. IASP currently has more than 7,200 members from 133 countries and in 94 chapters worldwide. IASP supports 20 Special Interest Groups (SIGs) which members may join to network and collaborate with others in their specific field of research or practice.

Global Year Against Pain 
In 2004, supported by various IASP chapters and federations holding their own local events and activities worldwide, IASP initiated its first "Global Year Against Pain" with the motto "The Relief of Pain Should be a Human Right". Every year, the focus is on another aspect of pain.

World Congress on Pain 
The World Congress on Pain is the largest global gathering of pain professionals. This event brings together more than 7,000 scientists, clinicians, and healthcare providers from around the world and across pain disciplines.. The program comprises plenary sessions, workshops, poster sessions, and refresher courses, and attendees may receive continuing medical education credits.

Special interest groups 
 Abdominal and pelvic pain
 Acute pain
 Cancer pain
 Clinical trials
 Complex regional pain syndrome
 Ethical and legal issues in pain
 Genetics and pain
 Itch
 Methodology, evidence synthesis, and implementation
 Musculoskeletal pain
 Neuromodulation
 Neuropathic pain

See also 
 Argentinian Association for the Study of Pain

References

External links 
 
 Special Interest Groups
 Iranpainsociety 

Medical associations based in the United States
Pain management
Medical and health organizations based in Washington, D.C.